Can't Let Go may refer to:
 "I Can't Let Go", a song made famous by the Hollies in 1966
"Can't Let Go", a song by Bryan Ferry from the 1978 album The Bride Stripped Bare
"Can't Let Go" (Earth, Wind & Fire song), 1979
"Can't Let Go" (Mariah Carey song), 1991
Can't Let Go, a 1995 album by Cantopop singer Sammi Cheng
"Can't Let Go" (Randy Weeks song), made famous by Lucinda Williams in 1998
"Can't Let Go" (Anthony Hamilton song), 2005
"Can't Let Go" (Linda Király song), 2007
"I Can't Let Go", a song by Annie from the 2009 album Don't Stop
 "I Can't Let Go" (Smash song), a 2013 song from the U.S. TV series Smash 
"Can't Let Go", a song by Australian singer Faydee released in 2013
"Can't Let Go", a song by American band Caught A Ghost from the 2014 album Human Nature, and featured as the theme song for the Amazon Prime original series Bosch
"Can't Let Go", a song by Adele from the 2015 album 25
"I Can’t Let Go", a 2022 album by Suki Waterhouse